References

1963 television seasons
1964 television seasons